The Duhast class tug is a little known class of  naval auxiliary currently in service with the People's Liberation Army Navy (PLAN), and this 3200-horsepower tug has received NATO reporting name Duhast class. Built by Wuhu Xinlian Shipbuilding Co., Ltd. (芜湖新联造船有限公司), formerly Wuhu Shipyard, since 2004, the name of this class is taken from the installed power of the vessels, with the exact type designation still remaining unknown. After the first pair was built, as of the mid-2010s, a total of twelve of this class have been confirmed as being in active service.

The 3200-horsepower class series ships in PLAN service are designated by a combination of two Chinese characters followed by three-digit number. The second Chinese character is Tuo (拖), meaning tug in Chinese, because these ships are classified as tugboats. The first Chinese character denotes which fleet the ship is service with, with East (Dong, 东) for East Sea Fleet, North (Bei, 北) for North Sea Fleet, and South (Nan, 南) for South Sea Fleet. However, the pennant numbers may have changed due to the change of Chinese naval ships naming convention.

References

External links
Wuhu Xinlian Shipbuilding Co., Ltd.

Auxiliary tugboat classes
Auxiliary ships of the People's Liberation Army Navy
Tugboats of the People's Liberation Army Navy